Poanas is one of the 39 municipalities of Durango, in northwestern Mexico. The municipal seat lies at Villa Unión. The municipality covers an area of 1841 km2.

As of 2010, the municipality had a total population of 24,918, up from 23,466 as of 2005.

The municipality had 61 localities, the largest of which (with 2010 populations in parentheses) were: Villa Unión (10,753), classified as urban, and Cieneguilla (1,984), San Atenógenes (La Villita) (1,844), La Joya (1,826), Orizaba (1,452), and Narciso Mendoza (1,053), classified as rural.

References

Municipalities of Durango